Pierre Wajoka (born 19 December 1978) is a retired New Caledonian footballer who played as a midfielder

He played one year for AS Lössi, the club representing his custom area. In 2011, he moved to Gaïtcha FCN. He is known for scoring the first ever goal in the 2010 FIFA World Cup qualification process against Tahiti on 25 August 2007.

He was part of the team which won the 2007 South Pacific Games. He also participated in the 2003 South Pacific Games, where New Caledonia won their group and reached the final of the competition, but were defeated by Fiji.

External links

References 

1978 births
Living people
New Caledonian footballers
New Caledonia international footballers
AS Magenta players
AS Lössi players
Gaïtcha FCN players
2008 OFC Nations Cup players
Association football midfielders